Crocanthemum nashii is a species of plant endemic to Florida and other parts of the southeastern United States. It is commonly called Florida scrub frostweed.

References 

Cistaceae
Endemic flora of Florida
Flora without expected TNC conservation status